Ryo Chiba (March 2, 1884 – November 8, 1963) was a Japanese politician who served as governor of Hiroshima Prefecture from Dec. 1931 to June 1932. He was governor of Nagano Prefecture (1927-1929) and Niigata Prefecture (1932-1935)

Governors of Hiroshima
Japanese Home Ministry government officials
1884 births
1963 deaths
Governors of Nagano
Governors of Niigata Prefecture